Ernst Pauer (21 December 1826 – 5 May 1905) was an Austrian pianist, composer and educator.

Biography
Pauer formed a direct link with great Viennese traditions: he was born in Vienna, his mother was a member of the famous Streicher family of piano makers, and for a time (1839–44) he was a piano pupil of Mozart's son, F. X. W. Mozart and a composition student of Simon Sechter. After further study with Franz Lachner in Munich (1845–47) he worked as a conductor and composer in Mainz, before moving to London in 1851.

During the Great 1862 International Exhibition in South Kensington he was engaged to perform daily piano recitals in the Exhibition building.

From the outset Pauer's piano playing was admired in London, and there he developed a series of concerts, with copious programme notes, that illustrated the development of keyboard music from 1600 to modern times; in later years he lectured on this and many other topics. For five years, he was on the staff of the National Training School for Music (1859–64) and was later recruited in 1876 as principal Piano Professor in the newly formed Royal College of Music, he was also associated with the music faculty of University of Cambridge.

Pauer's interest in early keyboard music and historically informed performance was reflected in his numerous editions. He was also active as an author and arranger. He retired in 1896 to Jugenheim in Germany, where he died in 1905.

His son Max von Pauer (1866–1945) became a world-renowned pianist too.

Selected list of works

Books
 The elements of the beautiful in music. London, Novello, 1876
 The art of pianoforte playing. London, Novello, Ewer and Co., 1877
 Musical forms. London, New York, Novello and Co., H.W. Gray Co, 1878
 The birthday book of musicians and composers. London, Edinburgh Forsyth Bros., 1881
 A dictionary of pianists and composers for the pianoforte. With an appendix of manufacturers of the instrument. London, Novello, Ewer & Co.'s Music Primers, etc. No. 46, 1895
 The Culture of the Left Hand. A Collection of useful and practical [P. F.] Exercises and Studies for giving strength, firmness, independence and suppleness to the left hand. Selected, fingered, revised and edited by E. Pauer, etc. London, Augener, 1907

Music Editions
 Alte Claviermusik in chronologischer Folge neu hrsg. und mit Vortragszeichen vers. von E. Pauer. Leipzig, Senff, o. J.
 Alte Meister. Sammlung werthvoller Klavierstücke des 17. und 18. Jahrhunderts. Leipzig, Breitkopf und Härtel, o. J., 3 Bände
 R. Schumann's vocal album. London, Augener, o. D.
 The piano works of F. Mendelssohn-Bartholdy edited by E. Pauer. London, Augener, 1865-1873
 Recollections of Meyerbeer. Six transcriptions for the Pianoforte. London, 1867
 Winter Journey. Die Winterreise. 24 Songs with pianoforte accompaniment. Edited by E. Pauer. Eng. & Ger. Offenbach s./M, Chez Jean André, 1871
 Das wohltemperierte Klavier. 48 preludes and fugues by J.S. Bach. 1874
 50 harpsichord lessons selected, revised and fingered by E. Pauer. 1877
 The complete Piano works of W. A. Mozart, edited by E. Pauer. 1874
 The complete Piano Works by F. Schubert, edited by E. Pauer. London, Augener, 1874
 Mendelssohn-Bartholdy. Complete works for Pianoforte and Orchestra with a compressed score of the Orchestral accompaniments to be used on a second Pianoforte. Arranged and revised by E. Pauer. London, 1879
 The piano works of Robert Schumann, edited by E. Pauer. 1879 (?)
 Complete Pianoforte solo works [by Haydn, Joseph]. Edited by E. Pauer. London, 1879
 The Children's Beethoven. Short pieces for the Pianoforte revised by E. Pauer. London, Augener, 1879
 Old English Composers for the Virginals & Harpsichord. A collection of preludes, galliards, pavanes, grounds, chaconnes, suites, overtures, sonatas, etc. etc. selected from the works of William Byrde, Dr. John Bull, Orlando Gibbons, Dr. John Blow, Henry Purcell and Dr. Thomas Augustine Arne. Revised & edited by E. Pauer. With biographical notices by W. A. Barrett, etc. 1879
 The complete piano solo works by C. M. von Weber, edited by E. Pauer. London, Augener, 1879
 Transcriptions for the Pianoforte by F. Liszt. Revised by E. Pauer, 1880
 Schulhoff-Album. Favorite Pianoforte Pieces. Edited by E. Pauer. London, Augener & Co, 1882-1878
 Complete Piano Works of L. van Beethoven. Edited by Ernst Pauer. London, Augener & Co., 1865 - 1873
 50 Special and Preparatory Studies for the pianoforte intended as an assistance to a thoroughly artistic performance of Beethoven's Sonatas. London, Augener & Co, 1895
 Zemiroth Israel, traditional Hebrew melodies chanted in the synagogue and the home edited, harmonized and arranged for the pianoforte by Ernst Pauer; with an explanatory preface by Francis L. Cohen. London, Augener, 1896
 The complete dances by L. van Beethoven, edited, revised and partly arranged for the pianoforte by E. Pauer. London, Augener & Co., ca. 1892
 Alte Tänze. Samml. d. berühmtesten dt., franz. u. ital. Gavotten; für Pianoforte ausgew., theilw. einger. u. durchges. von E. Pauer. Leipzig, Breitkopf und Härtel, 1910

References

External links

 

Austrian male composers
Austrian composers
Austrian classical pianists
Male classical pianists
Austrian music educators
Piano pedagogues
1826 births
1905 deaths
Academics of the Royal Academy of Music
People associated with the University of Cambridge
19th-century classical pianists
19th-century male musicians